Sven Anders Herman Danielsson (born 27 December 1953) is a Swedish government official who served as Director-General and Head of the Swedish Security Service from 2007 to 2012 and as Director-General of the Swedish Migration Board from 2012 to 2016. He served as Governor of Västra Götaland County from 2017 to 2021.

Anders Danielsson lives in Stockholm and Skåne. He is married and has two children.

References

|-

|-

|-

|-

Swedish police officers
1953 births
Living people